Bellevigny is a commune in the department of Vendée, western France. The municipality was established on 1 January 2016 by merger of the former communes of Belleville-sur-Vie and Saligny.

Population

Economy 
The Dubreuil Group and subsidiary French Bee (formerly French Blue) have their head offices in the Belleville-sur-Vie area of Bellevigny.

Education
Public schools:
 École publique Les Chaumes (Belleville-sur-Vie) - preschool and elementary school
 École publique Sablier du Frêne (Saligny)
 Collège Antoine de Saint-Exupery (Belleville-sur-Vie) - junior high school

Private schools (both primary schools):
 École Primaire Privée Saint Augustin (Belleville-sur-Vie)
 École Primaire Privée Sacré Cœur (Saligny)

The commune has a library in Saligny and media centre in Belleville-sur-Vie.

See also 
Communes of the Vendée department

References

External links

 Official site 

Communes of Vendée
Populated places established in 2016
2016 establishments in France
States and territories established in 2016